Allium sacculiferum, also called northern plain chive or triangular chive, is an East Asian species of wild onion native to Japan, Korea, eastern Russia (Amur Oblast, Khabarovsk, Primorye), and northeastern China (Inner Mongolia, Heilongjiang, Jilin, Liaoning). It is found along the banks of lakes and rivers at elevations less than 500 m.

Allium sacculiferum makes one or two egg-shaped bulbs up to 20 mm across. Scapes are up to 70 cm tall, round in cross-section. Leaves are flat, shorter than the scape, up to 5 mm across. Umbels are spherical, with many flowers crowded together. Tepals are lilac to reddish-violet with darker midveins.

References

External links
 

sacculiferum
Onions
Flora of Eastern Asia
Flora of the Russian Far East
Flora of China
Plants described in 1859